The 2016–17 Swiss Cup was the 92nd season of Switzerland's annual football cup competition. The competition commenced on 13 August 2016 with the first games of Round 1 and concluded on 25 May 2017 with the Final. The winner of the competition was FC Basel.

Participating clubs
All teams from 2015–16 Super League and 2015–16 Challenge League as well as the top 4 teams from 2015–16 Promotion League automatically entered this year's competition. The remaining 41 teams had to qualify through separate qualifying rounds within their leagues. Reserve teams and teams from Liechtenstein are not allowed in the competition, the latter only enter the 2016–17 Liechtenstein Cup.

Teams in bold are still active in the competition.

TH Title holders.

Round 1
Teams from Super League and Challenge League were seeded in this round. In a match, the home advantage was granted to the team from the lower league, if applicable. Teams in bold continue to the next round of the competition.

|-
| colspan="3" style="background:#9cc;"|10 August 2016

|-
| colspan="3" style="background:#9cc;"|14 August 2016

|-
| colspan="3" style="background:#9cc;"|15 August 2016

|}

Round 2
In a match, the home advantage was granted to the team from the lower league, if applicable. Teams in bold continue to the next round of the competition.

|-
| colspan="3" style="background:#9cc;"|16 September 2016

|-
| colspan="3" style="background:#9cc;"|17 September 2016

|-
| colspan="3" style="background:#9cc;"|18 September 2016

|}

Round 3
The winners of Round 2 played in this round. The home advantage was granted to the team from the lower league. Teams in bold continue to the quarter-finals.

|-
| colspan="3" style="background:#9cc;"|26 October 2016

|-
| colspan="3" style="background:#9cc;"|27 October 2016

|-
| colspan="3" style="background:#9cc;"|2 November 2016

|}

Quarter-finals
The winners of Round 3 played in the Quarter-finals, there was no home advantage granted in the draw. SC Kriens, from the third tier of Swiss football, were the lowest-ranked team in this round.

Semi-finals 
The winners of Quarterfinals play in the Semifinals, there is no home advantage granted in the draw. The games played on the 5 April 2017.

Final 
The winners of the Semifinals play in the Final. The match will be played on 25 May 2017 at the Stade de Genève.

References

External links
 Official site 
 Official site 
 Official site 

Swiss Cup seasons
Swiss Cup
Cup